Sandakozhi is a 2005 Indian Tamil-language action film written and directed by N. Linguswamy and produced by Vikram Krishna under the banner of G K Film Corporation, which stars Vishal, Meera Jasmine, Rajkiran, and Lal in lead roles, whilst Raja, Suman Setty, and Ganja Karuppu as supporting roles. The film's score and soundtrack are composed by Yuvan Shankar Raja.

The film released on 16 December 2005 to rave reviews and has become one of the huge hits in 2005, running for more than 200 days in theatres. It was declared a blockbuster at the box office and cult film for action film genre. The Telugu dubbed version titled Pandem Kodi was released on 19 May 2006 and was commercially successful. The film was remade in Kannada as Vayuputra. It was also remade in Odia as Ganja Ladhei. A sequel titled Sandakozhi 2 was released in 2018.

Plot
Balu is an engineering student, who visits his classmate and friend Karthik's home in Chidambaram after the final exams. He meets Karthik's sister Hema and they develop an affection which transforms into love. Kasi is the local gangster in Chidambaram who is feared by the entire town. On his way back to his place, Balu sees Kasi chasing a man with an aruval. When Kasi was about to kill the man he was chasing, Balu interferes and stops Kasi. An angered Kasi immediately tries to attack Balu, Balu smashes Kasi in front of everyone to save himself and leaves.

Kasi is furious and wants vengeance against Balu. Kasi's men trap Karthik/Hema's father and learns about Balu's native place. Kasi sets goons to kill Balu, but gets shocked when he learns that Balu's father is a powerful chieftain of Theni named Durai, and it will be difficult to attack them. Kasi leaves to Theni and waits for the right moment to kill Balu and his family. Balu meets Hema, Karthik and their family at a temple. Hema/Karthik's father is initially angered by seeing Balu as he was responsible to bring trouble by hitting Kasi, but Balu convinces him and both the families decide to get Balu and Hema married to each other.

One day, Kasi tries to kill Balu, but instead attacks Durai. Durai understands that Balu is being targeted and decides to protect him. A localite in Theni hates Durai and his family and decides to help Kasi kill Durai. Kasi utilize the opportunity to kill Balu and Durai, during a temple festival, but Balu saves Durai and fights Kasi. Durai asks Balu to fight with him and win. Balu thrashes Kasi and leaves, challenging him to return if he still has guts to finish him.

Cast

 Vishal as Balu
 Meera Jasmine as Hema
 Rajkiran as Durai
 Lal as Kasi
 Raja as Karthik
 Suman Shetty as Ilango
 Ganja Karuppu as Karuppu
 Thalaivasal Vijay as Durai's enemy who befriends Kasi
 Jaya Murali as Hema's mother
 Shanmugarajan as Durai's brother-in-law
 Thennavan as Durai's brother-in-law
George Maryan as Lawyer 
 Mu Ramaswamy as Villager
 Monica as Balu's cousin
 Dhandapani 
 John Amirtharaj as Hema's father
 Vidharth (uncredited role) as Balu and Karthik's friend
 Elango Kumaravel (uncredited role) as Balu and Karthik's friend

Production
The story was originally narrated for Vijay with Jyothika as heroine, but both were replaced by Vishal & Meera Jasmine later. Vishal says that he worked hard for the role by taking courses in acting and dancing.

A fight scene involving Vishal and Lal was picturised in Dindigul for seven days. The songs have been shot at locations in Australia, New Zealand and Chennai. An introduction song for Rajkiran was shot at Theni.

Soundtrack

The soundtrack, composed by Yuvan Shankar Raja, teaming up for the first time with director N. Linguswamy and Vishal, was released on 25 November 2005. It features 5 tracks, the lyrics of which were written by Pa. Vijay, Na. Muthukumar, Yugabharathi and Thamarai. Both the film score as well as the songs were appreciated and praised as outstanding with the song "Dhavanipotta Deepavali" considered as the pick of the album.

Reception
Chennai Online wrote "'Sandakozhi' is an engaging entertainer, an action-flick with a difference". Sify wrote "It is well-packaged film without any big stars or unwanted sentiments. Technically, the film is slick with good music by Yuvan and outstanding camerawork by Jeeva and Nirav Shah".

Box office
The film was a commercial success grossing $4.5 million at the box office.

Sequel

In December 2015, Linguswamy announced that he would direct the sequel of Sandakozhi with Vishal again, which was shelved. However the project was revived in 2017 with Vishal confirming his presence in the sequel. Rajkiran from the original has been retained in the sequel with additional new cast involving Keerthi Suresh and Varalaxmi. The film was released in 2018 failed to replicate the success of its original film.

References

External links
 

2005 films
Films shot in Madurai
2005 action drama films
2000s masala films
Tamil films remade in other languages
Films directed by N. Lingusamy
Films scored by Yuvan Shankar Raja
2000s Tamil-language films
Films shot in Australia
Films shot in New Zealand
Indian action drama films